Nelson Welsh Congregational Church is a historic Congregational church located at Nelson, Madison County, New York.  It was built in 1876, and is a one-story, three bay by four bay, timber-frame structure with a gable roof and stone foundation. It measures 34 feet by 55 feet.  It features a three-stage bell tower with octagonal spire.  Also on the property are a contributing privy and cemetery.  The cemetery contains the graves of Nelson's earliest settlers with the oldest stone dated to 1809.

It was added to the National Register of Historic Places in 1993.

References

United Church of Christ churches in New York (state)
Churches on the National Register of Historic Places in New York (state)
Churches completed in 1876
Churches in Madison County, New York
National Register of Historic Places in Madison County, New York